Thomas Langdon (8 January 1879 – 30 November 1944) was an English cricketer who played first-class cricket for Gloucestershire between 1900 and 1914. He was born at Brighton, Sussex, and died at Nuneaton, Warwickshire.

References

1879 births
1944 deaths
English cricketers
Gloucestershire cricketers
West of England cricketers
Players of the South cricketers